The concept of fictitious commodities (or false commodities) originated in Karl Polanyi's 1944 book The Great Transformation and refers to anything treated as market commodity that is not created for the market, specifically land, labor, and money.

Critique of commodification
For Polanyi, the effort by classical and neoclassical economics to make society subject to the free market was a utopian project and, as Polanyi scholars Fred Block and Margaret Somers claim, "When these public goods and social necessities (what Polanyi calls "fictitious commodities") are treated as if they are commodities produced for sale on the market, rather than protected rights, our social world is endangered and major crises will ensue."

Polanyi's insight follows the Marxian notions of "commodification" and "Commodity fetishism." Fetishism in anthropology refers to the primitive belief that godly powers can inhere in inanimate things, e.g., in totems. Marx uses this concept to describe "commodity fetishism." For Marx, "a commodity appears at first sight an extremely obvious, trivial thing. But its analysis brings out that it is a very strange thing, abounding in metaphysical subtleties and theological niceties." And what is a social relation between people, between "capitalists" and "exploited laborers," instead assumes "the fantastic form of a relation between things."

David Bollier wrote that, according to Polanyi, "prior to the rise of the market as an ordering principle for society, politics, religion and social norms were the prevailing forces of governance. Land, labor and money itself were not regarded chiefly as commodities to be bought and sold. They were embedded in social relationships, and subject to the moral consideration, religious beliefs and community management." As Polanyi points out, these are actually “fictitious commodities” in the sense that they are not truly discrete “products.” Land and human beings have their own sovereign dynamics apart from their treatment as market commodities. Treating them as "mere commodities" creates "dangerous pressures" — as when too much carbon is emitted into the atmosphere or people lose their jobs because they are “redundant.”

See also
Embeddedness
Economistic fallacy
Labour is not a commodity

References

Commodities
Commodities used as an investment
Business terms
Economic anthropology